The Nicolae Testemițanu State University of Medicine and Pharmacy (USMF) is a university located in Chișinău, Moldova. The institution began its activity in 1945. It is named after Nicolae Testemițanu.

History 
The Chişinău State University of Pharmacy and Medicine was established as part of the Medicine Institute No. 2 from Leningrad, which was evacuated during the Second World War in Kislovodsk, which was later transferred to Chişinău together with the students and the teaching staff under the name of the State Institute of Medicine.

The Institute began its activity on October 20, 1945 with only one active faculty, that being General Medicine which had 32 departments and 1000 students. The didactic process was performed by 130 professors, including 20 habilitated doctors and 23 doctors in medical science. Through time other faculties were established, such as:

 Pediatric Faculty (1954)
 Stomatology Faculty (1959)
 Faculty of Preventive Medicine (1964)
 Pharmacy Faculty (1964)

Since 1990 the Institute has the name of Nicolae Testemiţanu. On July 25, 1991 the State Institute of Medicine "Nicolae Testemiţnu" was reorganised as a university. In 1995, it was renamed to its current name.

Awards 

 Order of Work Glory (October 6, 2005)

See also
 List of universities in Moldova
 Education in Moldova

References

External links
Nicolae Testemițanu State University of Medicine and Pharmacy Website

Universities in Moldova
Education in Chișinău